Iron Earth, Copper Sky is a 1987 German-Turkish drama film, written, produced and directed by Zülfü Livaneli based on the novel of the same name by Yaşar Kemal, featuring Rutkay Aziz as a simple villager elevated to sainthood status while still alive. The film, which premiered in the Un Certain Regard section at the 1987 Cannes Film Festival on 4 May 1987, won the OCIC Award at the 1987 San Sebastián International Film Festival and a German Camera Award for Jürgen Jürges.

Cast
 Rutkay Aziz
 Yavuzer Çetinkaya
 Gürel Yontan
 Uğur Esen
 Macide Tanır
 Serap Aksoy
 Tuncay Akça
 Yasemin Alkaya
 Rana Cabbar
 Melih Çardak
 Ingeborg Carsters
 Dilek Damlacık
 Eray Özbal
 Peter Schulze
 Yudum Yontan

References

External links

1987 films
Films set in Turkey
1980s Turkish-language films
1987 drama films
Films directed by Zülfü Livaneli
Turkish drama films